Savale Samali is a 2017–2018 Tamil reality-comedy game show that airs on Sun TV every Sunday at 13:00 (IST) beginning 5 November 2017 and 9 December 2018 for 55 Episodes. The show features Sun TV television soap opera families in which the actors will compete in a number of entertainment based challenges.

Hosted 
 Diya Menon (2017-2018)
 Adhavan (2017–2018)

List of Episodes

References

External links 
 Official Website 
 Sun TV on YouTube
 Sun TV Network 
 Sun Group 

Sun TV original programming
Tamil-language television shows
Tamil-language comedy television series
Tamil-language reality television series
2010s Tamil-language television series
2017 Tamil-language television series debuts
2018 Tamil-language television series endings